The WikiLeaks Party was a minor political party in Australia. The party was created in part to support Julian Assange's failed bid for a Senate seat in Australia in the 2013 election, where they won 0.66% of the national vote. At the time Assange was seeking refuge in the Ecuadorian embassy in London. The WikiLeaks Party national council consisted of Assange, Matt Watt, Gail Malone, Assange’s biological father John Shipton, Omar Todd and Gerry Georgatos. The party experienced internal dissent over its governance and electoral tactics and was deregistered due to low membership numbers in 2015.

Formation 
Assange's decision to run for the Australian Senate was announced via the WikiLeaks Twitter account in March 2012. The intent to form a WikiLeaks Party was announced by Assange in late 2012 and Assange stated that the party was to be a vehicle for his candidacy for a seat in the Australian Senate in the 2013 election.

On 23 March 2013, the WikiLeaks Party submitted its registrations to the Australian Electoral Commission. The party had over 1,300 fee-paying members. The application was accepted and the party was registered as a political party on 2 July 2013.

The party was involved in Glenn Druery's Minor Party Alliance around the 2013 federal election, but left after deciding not to preference as per Druery's advice.

Party platform 
The WikiLeaks Party subscribed to a libertarian ideology. Specific policies for the 2013 election included introduction of a national shield law to protect a reporter's right not to reveal a source and "promoting free information and protection for whistle-blowers".

CEO John Shipton stated that the party "stands for what Julian espouses — transparency and accountability in government and of course human rights". Assange himself has said the WikiLeaks Party would combine "a small, centralised leadership with maximum grassroots involvement" and that the party would advance WikiLeaks' objectives of promoting openness in government and politics and that it would combat intrusions on individual privacy. The Voice of Russia stated that Shipton in an interview "praised Russian diplomatic skills and Russian President Vladimir Putin and Foreign Minister Sergey Lavrov. Shipton and the WikiLeaks Party believe that the Russian President and Foreign Ministry are forces for peace".

Assange was reported as saying that he envisioned the WikiLeaks Party as bound together by unswerving commitment to the core principles of civic courage nourished by understanding and truthfulness and the free flow of information and one that will practise in politics what WikiLeaks has done in the field of information. The Constitution of the WikiLeaks Party lists objectives, including the protection of human rights and freedoms; transparency of governmental and corporate action, policy and information; recognition of the need for equality between generations; and support of Aboriginal and Torres Strait Islander self-determination. The WikiLeaks Party has criticised the Telstra Group's relationship with the FBI and US Department of Justice.

2013 election 
The party fielded candidates for the Australian Senate in the states of New South Wales, Victoria and Western Australia. Two polling experts rated the WikiLeaks Party's electoral chances as highly unlikely.

The WikiLeaks Party candidates for the 2013 election were as follows:

Victoria
 Julian Assange, WikiLeaks founder and publisher
 Leslie Cannold, who resigned on 21 August 2013; university academic and legalised abortion supporter
 Binoy Kampmark, law professor and writer 

New South Wales
 Kellie Tranter, lawyer and human rights activist 
 Alison Broinowski, former Australian diplomat and academic

Western Australia
 Gerry Georgatos, a former Greens candidate who resigned from the Greens in November 2009 after a falling out with some of the WA Greens; university researcher, journalist and human rights campaigner
 Suresh Rajan, former president of the Ethnic Communities Council WA and president of WA Epilepsy

Assange failed in his bid for a Senate seat. It is difficult to separate out his personal vote under the single transferable vote system. The party received 33,683 votes in Victoria from electors who voted the WikiLeaks ticket with Assange at its head and Assange received an additional 8,016 first preference votes from electors who numbered the candidates individually. The party as a whole received 1.24% (the 7th highest primary vote in Victoria) and reached the 26th round of ballot before being eliminated without the opportunity to receive preference flows. The party received 88,100 votes or 0.66% nationally, but only contested seats in three states. Gerry Georgatos came closest to winning a Senate seat for the WikiLeaks Party, reaching the 19th round with only seven rounds to go before being eliminated, also before any opportunity to receive preference flows. He fell about 3,000 primary votes short of being elected, but given that the party received only 9,767 primary votes in Western Australia, this was a large gap.

Christine Milne, leader of the Australian Greens, was positive about the emergence of the WikiLeaks Party as part of a move away from Australia's two-party system. However, the Greens said they had no intention of stepping aside for Assange in the Victoria Senate election. Similarly, the Socialist Equality Party reaffirmed its intention to defend Assange against persecution, but refused to endorse the WikiLeaks Party, stating that its position represented the "interests of the working class".

Professor Anne Twomey, an expert on Australian constitutional law at the University of Sydney, suggested that if Assange were elected, this could be found invalid in the event of a legal challenge if a court ruled that his relationship with Ecuador breached the prohibition against the election of people "under any [acknowledgement] of allegiance, obedience or adherence to a foreign power".

Voting issues 
The party's campaign was thrown into turmoil just weeks before the 2013 election when members objected strongly to the party's voting preferences (see single transferable vote). In New South Wales, a fascist group was placed above the Greens while in Western Australia the National Party was placed above Greens Senator Scott Ludlam, a strong supporter of WikiLeaks and Assange. The WikiLeaks Party blamed an unspecified "admin error" and announced an independent review would be held after the election. Jamal Daoud, a member of the National Council, said the preferences were directed personally by Assange. Greg Barns, a former election adviser to the party, said that was a "nasty allegation with no substance whatsoever." According to Dr. Daniel Mathews, "the initial view was that the party had submitted a mistake," but "subsequent evidence has come to light that it may not have been entirely a mistake." Ludlam said "There's no administrative error. One of our guys was told last week well before this decision got locked away that that was what they were going to do." Greens staffer Max Phillips said The WikiLeaks Party’s NSW deputy registered officer Cassie Findlay told him about the decision a week before it became public. 

When National Council members complained, CEO John Shipton attempted to go around them and create a new power base. Leslie Cannold, Assange's running mate in Victoria, resigned along with four other members of the National Council and several key volunteers.

The party published a short, inconclusive review by a party member five months later. Former member Gary Lord responded with a comprehensive 20-page report fully examining the party's failures.

Syria visit 
In December 2013, a delegation from the party, including its chairman John Shipton, visited Syria and met with President Bashar al-Assad with the goals of demonstrating "solidarity with the Syrian people and their nation" and improving the party's understanding of the country's civil war. In a statement issued shortly before the visit, the WikiLeaks Party stated that it opposed outside intervention in the war, supported a negotiated peace process and described reports of the Ghouta chemical attack by forces loyal to al-Assad in August 2013 as being "unsubstantiated" and comparable to the concerns which were raised over the Iraqi weapons of mass destruction program prior to the Iraq War. The meeting with President al-Assad was attended by National Council members John Shipton, Gail Malone and by former National Council member Jamal Daoud.

The meeting with Assad was criticized by the Australian Prime Minister, Foreign Minister and many WikiLeaks supporters. Shipton stated that the meeting with al-Assad was "just a matter of good manners" and that the delegation had also met with members of the Syrian opposition. However, these meetings with the opposition have not been verified. Former National Council member and advocate for Shias in Sydney, Jamal Daoud (who had resigned from the Greens over differences) accompanied Shipton on the trip and expressed support for Assad on Twitter and on his blog. Shipton said he was going to sue Tony Abbott and Julie Bishop for criticising the party’s delegation to Syria but never sued.

2014 election 
The WikiLeaks Party contested the 5 April re-run of the disqualified 2013 Senate election (Western Australia component). The prior year's lead Senate Candidate Gerry Georgatos recommended to the National Council that he step down for Assange to take the lead Senate position for Western Australia and hopefully get elected. In February, the National Council learned that Assange would be ineligible to contest. Georgatos rejected continuing on as the endorsed candidate and asked that the membership be surveyed as to their preferred candidate. More than 500 WikiLeaks members completed the survey and Georgatos was endorsed as the lead candidate with West TV producer Tibor Meszaros at number 2 and journalist Lucy Nicol at number 3. One hour before the close of nominations, Georgatos withdrew for "unforeseen personal reasons" and Tibor Meszaros was consequently elevated to lead candidate. On 14 April, the AEC draw for the ballot of 33 parties (77 candidates) drew the WikiLeaks Party first.

Deregistration 
The WikiLeaks Party was deregistered by the Australian Electoral Commission on 23 July 2015 for lack of members under s.137(4) of the Electoral Act. Members of The WikiLeaks Party objected, saying the AEC's methods were out of date because they only counted landlines. Deputy Chairman and National Council Director of The WikiLeaks Party, Omar Todd said "The current electoral system makes it extremely difficult for smaller political parties to exist and will only get worse if the overhaul of the political system happens in the near future."

Missing funds 
In March 2014, Jamal Daoud said that the WikiLeaks National Council was denied access to the party’s books and copies of financial statements. He also said John Shipton told him the group was $70,000 in debt despite having no employees and no advertising. Daoud said it was "like a family convenience store." Shipton refused requests for interviews and comments.

References

External links 
 Official website

2013 establishments in Australia
2015 disestablishments in Australia
Political parties established in 2013
Political parties disestablished in 2015
Defunct political parties in Australia
Libertarianism in Australia
Libertarian parties
Julian Assange
WikiLeaks
Non-interventionist parties